Jim Sinclair is an autism-rights movement activist who, with fellow autistics Kathy Lissner Grant and Donna Williams, formed Autism Network International (ANI) in 1992.  Sinclair became the original coordinator of ANI.

Biography
Sinclair has said that they did not speak until age 12. Sinclair was raised as a girl, but describes having an intersex body and, in a 1997 introduction to the Intersex Society of North America, Sinclair wrote, "I remain openly and proudly neuter, both physically and socially."

In 1989, American talk show host Sally Jessy Raphael interviewed Toby (an alias of Sinclair), who was a then self-described androgynous and nonsexual person.

In 1998, Sinclair was a graduate student of rehabilitation counseling at Syracuse University in Syracuse, New York. They never found a job in the field despite possessing knowledge and qualifications, likely due to having a radical stance on autism and neurodiversity.

Sinclair was the first person to "articulate the autism-rights position".

Views
Sinclair wrote the essay, "Don't Mourn for Us" (1993) with an anti-cure perspective on autism.  The essay has been thought of by some to be a touchstone for the fledgling autism-rights movement, and has been mentioned in The New York Times and New York Magazine.

You didn't lose a child to autism. You lost a child because the child you waited for never came into existence. That isn't the fault of the autistic child who does exist, and it shouldn't be our burden. We need and deserve families who can see us and value us for ourselves, not families whose vision of us is obscured by the ghosts of children who never lived. Grieve if you must, for your own lost dreams. But don't mourn for us. We are alive. We are real.
—Jim Sinclair, "Don't Mourn for Us", Our Voice, Vol. 1, No. 3, 1993Sinclair also expresses their frustration with the double standard autistic people face, such as being told their persistence is "pathological" when neurotypical people are praised for their dedication to something important to them.

Sinclair is the first documented autistic person to reject people-first language.

Autreat 
Sinclair established and ran Autreat, the first independent autistic-run gathering, for fifteen years after attending conferences that mainly included parents of autistic children and professionals. They and other autistic adults described these conferences as isolating and dehumanizing. Autreat explicitly prioritizes autistic needs, with programs like an "Ask a Neurotypical" panel.

See also
Autism Network International

References

External links

 Website for Autreat and ANI
 Archived Website of Jim Sinclair at Archive.org
 Cultural Commentary: Being Autistic Together

American health activists
Asexual non-binary people
Autism activists
Intersex non-binary people
Living people
Non-binary activists
People on the autism spectrum
Syracuse University alumni
Year of birth missing (living people)